A base on balls (BB), also known as a walk, occurs in baseball when a batter receives four pitches that the umpire calls balls, and is in turn awarded first base without the possibility of being called out. The base on balls is defined in Section 2.00 of baseball's Official Rules, and further detail is given in 6.08(a).  It is considered a faux pas for a professional player to literally walk to first base; the batter-runner and any advancing runners normally jog on such a play.

The term "base on balls" distinguishes a walk from the other manners in which a batter can be awarded first base without liability to be put out (e.g., hit by pitch (HBP), catcher's interference). Though a base on balls, catcher's interference, or a batter hit by a pitched ball all result in the batter (and possibly runners on base) being awarded a base,  the term "walk" usually refers only to a base on balls, and not the other methods of reaching base without the bat touching the ball.  An important difference is that for a hit batter or catcher's interference, the ball is dead and no one may advance unless forced; the ball is live after a walk (see below for details).

A batter who draws a base on balls is commonly said to have been "walked" by the pitcher. When the batter is walked, runners advance one base without liability to be put out only if forced to vacate their base to allow the batter to take first base. If a batter draws a walk with the bases loaded, all preceding runners are forced to advance, including the runner on third base who is forced to home plate to score a run; when a run is forced on a walk, the batter is credited with an RBI per rule 9.04.

Receiving a base on balls does not count as a hit or an at bat for a batter but does count as a time on base and a plate appearance. Therefore, a base on balls does not affect a player's batting average, but it can increase his on-base percentage.

A hit by pitch is not counted statistically as a walk, though the effect is mostly the same, with the batter receiving a free pass to first base.  One exception is that on a HBP (hit-by-pitch), the ball is dead.  On a HBP, any runners attempting to steal on the play must return to their original base unless forced to the next base anyway.  When a walk occurs, the ball is still live: any runner not forced to advance may nevertheless attempt to advance at his own risk, which might occur on a steal play, passed ball, or wild pitch.  Also, because a ball is live when a base on balls occurs, runners on base forced to advance one base may attempt to advance beyond one base, at their own risk. The batter-runner himself may attempt to advance beyond first base, at his own risk.  Rule 6.08 addresses this matter as well.   An attempt to advance an additional base beyond the base awarded might occur when ball four is a passed ball or a wild pitch.

History
In early baseball, there was no concept of a "ball." It was created by the NABBP in 1863, originally as a sort of unsportsmanlike-conduct penalty: "Should the pitcher repeatedly fail to deliver to the striker fair balls, for the apparent purpose of delaying the game, or for any other cause, the umpire, after warning him, shall call one ball, and if the pitcher persists in such action, two and three balls; when three balls shall have been called, the striker shall be entitled to the first base; and should any base be occupied at that time, each player occupying them shall be entitled to one base without being put out." Note that this rule in effect gave the pitcher 9 balls, since each penalty ball could only be called on a third offense. In 1869 the rule was modified so that only those baserunners forced to advance could advance. From 1871 through 1886, the batter was entitled to call "high" or "low," i.e. above or below the waist; a pitch which failed to conform was "unfair." Certain pitches were defined as automatic balls in 1872: any ball delivered over the batter's head, that hit the ground in front of home plate, was delivered to the opposite side from the batter, or came within one foot of him.  In 1880, the National League changed the rules so that eight "unfair balls" instead of nine were required for a walk.  In 1884, the National League changed the rules so that six balls were required for a walk.  In 1886, the American Association changed the rules so that six balls instead of seven were required for a walk; however, the National League changed the rules so that seven balls were required for a walk instead of six.  In 1887, the National League and American Association agreed to abide by some uniform rule changes, including, for the first time, a strike zone which defined balls and strikes by rule rather than the umpire's discretion, and decreased the number of balls required for a walk to five.  In 1889, the National League and the American Association decreased the number of balls required for a walk to four. 

In 2017, Major League Baseball approved a rule change allowing for a batter to be walked intentionally by having the defending bench signal to the Umpire. The move was met with some controversy.

Intentional base on balls

A subset of the base on balls, an intentional base on balls (IBB) or intentional walk is when the defensive team intentionally issues a walk to the batter. In Major League Baseball and many amateur leagues, an intentional base on balls is signaled to the home plate umpire by the defensive team's manager holding up four fingers, at which point the batter is awarded first base without any further pitches being thrown. In some leagues and in Major League Baseball prior to 2017, an intentional base on balls is issued when the pitcher deliberately pitches the ball away from the batter four times (or as many times as needed to get to ball four if the decision to issue the intentional walk is made with one or more balls already on the count). As with any other walk, an intentional walk entitles the batter to first base without liability to be put out, and entitles any runners to advance if forced. 

Intentional walks are a strategic defensive maneuver, commonly done to bypass one hitter for one the defensive team believes is less likely to initiate a run-scoring play (e.g., a home run, sacrifice fly, or RBI base hit).  Teams also commonly use intentional walks to set up a double play or force out situation for the next batter.

Major League Baseball leaders

Career

Single-season

Game

Jimmie Foxx, Andre Thornton, Jeff Bagwell and Bryce Harper have each been walked six times during a major league regular season game. Among pitchers, Tommy Byrne and Bruno Haas both gave up 16 bases on balls in a game. The most consecutive walks to end a game since at least 1920 (with no outs in between the walks) is five, which occurred when the Los Angeles Dodgers beat the Arizona Diamondbacks in 2019.

See also related lists

Baseball statistics
List of Major League Baseball career bases on balls leaders
List of Major League Baseball career total bases leaders
List of Major League Baseball career on-base percentage leaders
List of Major League Baseball career OPS leaders
3,000 strikeout club
List of Major League Baseball career strikeout leaders

References

External links
Career walks leaders, Baseball-Reference.com
Single-season walks leaders, Baseball-Reference.com

Baseball terminology
Baseball pitching
Batting (baseball)
Pitching statistics
Batting statistics